The Order of Military Merit (Wisam al-Istahaqaq al-Askari) is an order of the Kingdom of Jordan.

History 
It was instituted in 1976 by King Hussein bin Talal.

The Order of Military Merit is awarded for distinguished services by members of the Jordanian armed forces and foreign military officials. Civilians may also receive the order in reward for exceptional services in the defence of the Kingdom.

Grades 
The Order of Military Merit is awarded in five classes:

Grand Cordon: awarded to general officers and above.

Grand Officer: awarded to full colonels and above.

Commander: awarded to field officers and above.

Officer: awarded to officers below field rank.

Knight: awarded to other ranks.

The Order of Military Merit is divided in five classes:

Notable recipients 
Air Chief Marshal Anwar Shamim - Former Chief of Air Staff (Pakistan) 1978-1985

General Shamim Alam Khan - Former Chairman Joint Chief of Staff (Pakistan) 1991-1994

Air Chief Marshal Farooq Feroze Khan - Former Chairman Joint Chief of Staff (1994-1997) & Chief of Air Staff (Pakistan) 1991-1994

Air Chief Marshal Abbas Khattak - Former Chief of Air Staff (Pakistan) 1994-1997

General Jehangir Karamat - Former Chief of Army Staff (Pakistan) 1996-1998

Admiral Fasih Bokhari - Former Chief of Naval Staff (Pakistan) 1997-1999

General Aziz Khan - Former Chairman Joint Chief of Staff (Pakistan) 2001-2004

General Qamar Javed Bajwa - Current Chief of Army Staff (Pakistan) 2016-

General Nadeem Raza - Current Chairman Joint Chief of Staff (Pakistan) 2019-

References 

Orders, decorations, and medals of Jordan
Awards established in 1976